Yan Huo(Chinese:霍焱) (born 1968) is managing partner and chief investment officer of Capula Investment Management. Prior to co-founding Capula in 2005, Yan spent most of his professional career at JPMorgan, where he worked in its derivatives research and proprietary positioning business.

In 2018, Huo earned £36.4 million, half of what he received in 2017.

Huo donated £200,000 to the British Conservative Party during the 2019 United Kingdom general election.

Yan Huo is a trustee of Fudan University and Princeton University. He holds a PhD and an MA in electrical engineering from Princeton University and a BS in physics from Fudan University.

Philanthropy

In 2009, Huo set up the Huo Family Foundation with a mission to support education, communities and the pursuit of knowledge.  Since its inception, the Foundation has given or pledged $55m to charitable causes. The foundation was recently credited with supporting the Oxford Internet Institute's study into the effect of prolonged game-time on adolescent mental health 

As a response to the Coronavirus pandemic, the Huo Family Foundation made a number of donations to UK universities to fund research into testing and tracing the virus. This included donations to Imperial College's REACT study, King's College's investigation into the longevity of coronavirus antibodies, and Oxford University's work in partnership with the Office for National Statistics looking into how immunity in the population changes with infection and vaccination.

In December 2020 Huo became a signatory of the Giving Pledge, affirming his commitment to giving the majority of his wealth to charitable causes

References

Living people
American derivatives traders
American financiers
American hedge fund managers
American investors
American money managers
American people of Chinese descent
American stock traders
JPMorgan Chase people
Princeton University alumni
Stock and commodity market managers
1968 births
Conservative Party (UK) donors
Fudan University alumni